Ashby is an unincorporated community in Warren County, Virginia, United States. It sits at an elevation of 597 feet (182 m).

References

Unincorporated communities in Warren County, Virginia
Unincorporated communities in Virginia